Boråshallen is a sports venue in Borås, Sweden. It's the main arena for indoor sports in Borås.

Halls

The building has two big halls (A and B) and two smaller halls (C and D).

Concerts
The A hall has sometimes been used for concerts. In October 28, 1963, The Beatles held a concert in front of 2500 people.

References

Sports venues in Borås
1957 establishments in Sweden
Sports venues completed in 1957